Sieve method, or the method of sieves, can mean:
 in mathematics and computer science, the sieve of Eratosthenes, a simple method for finding prime numbers
 in number theory, any of a variety of methods studied in sieve theory
 in combinatorics, the set of methods dealt with in sieve theory or more specifically, the inclusion–exclusion principle
 in statistics, and particularly econometrics, the use of sieve estimators